Zhang Ping (born November 1953) is a Chinese novelist and politician who served as Vice Governor of Shanxi between January 2008 and January 2013.  Zhang served as vice president of the China Democratic League and vice president of China Writers Association between 2002 and 2008. Zhang was a member of the 9th, 10th, 11th National Committee of the Chinese People's Political Consultative Conference.

Biography
Zhang was born in Xinjiang County, Shanxi in November 1953. He entered Shanxi Normal University in 1978, majoring in Chinese language at the Department of Chinese Language and Culture, where he graduated in 1982.

Zhang started to publish works in 1981. Zhang joined the China Writers Association in 1985.

From 1982 to 1986, Zhang worked in Pingyang Literature and Art as an editor.

From 2002 to 2008, Zhang served as vice president of the China Democratic League, and vice president of the China Writers Association.

Works

Novels
 Decision 
 Skynet
 The Murderer
 Boys and Girls
 Ambush From All Sides
 National Cadre

Reportage
 Orphan's Tears

Awards
 Decision – 5th Mao Dun Literature Prize (2000)
 6th Zhuang Zhongwen Literature Prize

References

1953 births
Politicians from Yuncheng
Shanxi Normal University alumni
Writers from Shanxi
Living people
Vice-governors of Shanxi
Mao Dun Literature Prize laureates
Chinese male novelists
People's Republic of China politicians from Shanxi